Elizabeth Arciniega (born Elizabeth Arciniega Haag) is a Mexican actress and director in living in Zürich.

Life
Born in Mexico City, Mexico, Arciniega studied dramatic literature and theatre at the National Autonomous University in Mexico (UNAM). Afterwards she studied further under Adriana Barraza and Ludwik Margules to perfect her acting skills.

Her first lead roles were on stage in classical plays such as Poesia en voz muda de Luis Mario Moncada where she was nominated as the best actress in the V. National Youth Theater Award, which was organised by the National Institute Bellas Artes (INBA), the Administration of the Government of Mexico City (DDF), SOCICULTUR and the centre of youth consultation and was handed over by José Solé. For the role of Laura Winfield in The Glass Menagerie she got the award for the best new actress from the Mexican Society for Theatre Critics (AMCT). Following this she played numerous roles in theatre, television mini-dramas and films. All in all she has contributed to more than 50 productions though most of her lead roles have been in theatre.

The television mini-dramas María Belén and Mujeres engañadas have been a highlight as they were exported all over the world after January 2001. Arciniega played the lawyer defending the child María Belén.

Another career highlight has been her role in 2008 in the James Bond film Quantum of Solace, where she played the girlfriend of Mr. White, Bond's opponent.

In 2004 she married a Swiss and moved to Zurich where she founded the theatre group LaVox Theater, in which she is director and actress. The aim of LaVox Theater is to bring an awareness and understanding of the Spanish spoken theatre and culture into the German-speaking areas. LaVox Theater had presentations in different Swiss cities and was honored by two Mexican ambassadors in Switzerland for the presentations of Rosa de dos Aromas, Biografía de Mujer and Sueño de Monja.

Filmography

References

External links 
 
 Homepage Elizabeth Arciniega

Year of birth missing (living people)
Living people
Mexican telenovela actresses
Mexican television actresses
Mexican film actresses
Mexican stage actresses
Actresses from Mexico City
20th-century Mexican actresses
21st-century Mexican actresses
National Autonomous University of Mexico alumni
Naturalised citizens of Switzerland
Mexican emigrants to Switzerland